The 2006 Kansas City Wizards season was the 11th in Major League Soccer. Kansas City continued its decline in the Eastern Conference, finishing with 38 points (10W 14L 8D) and once again joining the Columbus Crew in missing out on post-season play. Despite this, attendance at the cavernous Arrowhead Stadium rose back to around 11,000.

Three Wizards, Jimmy Conrad, Eddie Johnson, and Josh Wolff, represented the United States men's national soccer team at the 2006 FIFA World Cup. The US finished among the worst teams in the tournament, but Conrad and Johnson made substitute appearances in the tournament. An additional player, talented defender José Burciaga Jr., stood out as the top player at the club, making MLS Best XI and becoming the team MVP for the season.

On July 19, 2006, Bob Gansler departed his position as head coach; to that point, he was the most successful manager in Wizards history, winning every trophy the club had amassed to that point (one MLS Cup, one U.S. Open Cup, and one Supporters' Shield). Fans were reportedly pleased with the move, with some having called the longtime coach "Bunker Bob."

This season also marked the final under the MLS multi-club ownership of Lamar Hunt and his sports properties, as a major shift occurred. First, Hunt sold the club to OnGoal, LLC in August (Hunt, a titan of U.S. sports including in MLS, died in December). Next, the new ownership actively looked out for land in the Kansas City area to build a new, soccer-specific stadium to house the club, kicking off a five-year, six-season and three-stadium process leading to an eventual rebrand in 2011.

Squad

Competitions

Major League Soccer

Overall

Conference

U.S. Open Cup

Squad statistics

Final Statistics

References

Sporting Kansas City seasons
Kansas City Wizards
Kansas
Kansas City Wizards